Radoslav Glavaš may refer to:

 Radoslav Glavaš (senior) (1867–1913), Herzegovinian Croat Franciscan
 Radoslav Glavaš (junior) (1909–1945), Herzegovinian Croat Franciscan and fascist collaborator